Yongchang County is a county located in the southern half of the prefecture-level city of Jinchang in north-central Gansu province, China, bordering Qinghai to the south. It has been associated with the historical Liqian and Fanhe counties. The village of Zhelaizhai, located in Jiaojiazhuang township, has been the subject of international academic and media attention for its potential connection to Sino-Roman relations.

History 

The ancient Northern Silk Road passes through Yongchang County; numerous Han envoys were sent west along this trackway, some parties exceeding 100 members, late in the first millennium BC. The Han dynasty sent one mission to Parthia, which was reciprocated around 100 BC: Roman emissaries were captured by the Chinese in 30 BC along the Silk Road at Yongchang.

At various times during the 20th century and early 21st century, the county has entered the sight of media because some of the inhabitants of Jiaojiazhuang township's Liqian village (Zhelaizhai), located where the ancient Liqian county had existed in the early imperial period (Western Han dynasty to Sui dynasty), have been theorized to be descendants of a Roman legion. Although this story has been seized upon by enthusiastic Chinese of the area and non-specialist Westerners, at least two eminent Chinese authorities have shown that the notion has serious shortcomings.

Administrative divisions 
In 1996, Yongchang County was made up of four towns and six townships. In 2000, Dongzhai township and Shuiyuan township both became towns. Since that change, Yongchang County has been made up of the following six towns and four townships:

Six towns:
Chengguan, Hexibu, Xinchengzi, Zhuwangbu, Dongzhai, Shuiyuan

Four townships:
Hongshanyao, Jiaojiazhuang, Liuba, Nanba

Climate

Transport 
China National Highway 312

Gallery

References

External links 

County-level divisions of Gansu
Jinchang